HD 231701 is a yellow-white hued star in the northern constellation of Sagitta, near the southern constellation border with Aquila. With an apparent visual magnitude of 8.97, it is too dim to be viewed with the naked eye, but can be seen with powerful binoculars or a small telescope. Parallax measurements provide a distance estimate of approximately 356 light years from the Sun, but it is drifting closer with a radial velocity of −63 km/s.

HD 231701 is named Uruk. The name was selected in the NameExoWorlds campaign by Iraq, during the 100th anniversary of the IAU. Uruk was an ancient city of the Sumer and Babylonian civilizations in Mesopotamia.

This object is an ordinary F-type main-sequence star with a stellar classification of F8 V. It is around three to 4.5 billion years old and may be evolving onto the subgiant branch. It is spinning with a projected rotational velocity of 4 km/s and has low chromospheric activity. HD 231701 has 1.2 times the mass of the Sun and 1.45 times the Sun's radius. It is radiating 2.6 times the luminosity of the Sun from its photosphere at an effective temperature of 6,081 K.

See also
 List of extrasolar planets

References

External links
 

F-type main-sequence stars
Planetary systems with one confirmed planet
Sagitta (constellation)
Durchmusterung objects
231701
096078